Phalonidia amasiana is a species of moth of the family Tortricidae. It is found in Turkey and Ukraine.

References

Moths described in 1894
Phalonidia